Cliff Nyakeya is a Kenyan professional footballer who plays as an attacking midfielder/wingrand for FC Masr in the Egyptian premier league and the Kenya national football team.

Career

Nyakeya started his senior career with Gor Mahia. After that, he played for Mathare United. In 2019, he signed for Masr in the Egyptian Premier League, where he has made six league appearances and scored zero goals.

References

External links
 Cliff Nyakeya eager to make league debut
 Ex-Kenya international backs Nyakeya to shine in Egypt
 I almost quit football in 2014 – Cliff Nyakeya recounts his past
 Nyakeya eager to graduate from Stars' reserve player to regular starter

1995 births
Kenyan footballers
Living people
Kenya international footballers
Gor Mahia F.C. players
Mathare United F.C. players
Association football wingers